Pura Girinatha is the largest Balinese Hindu temple in East Timor. It is located in the quarter Taibesi, in the south of the capital city of Dili, near the local market. The temple is located on a small hill outside the city center, but is accessible by car.

History
Timor has no traditional Hindu population. The temple was built during the Indonesian occupation and was intended for the Hindu immigrants of that time, who mainly came from Bali. The inauguration took place on 27 June 1987 by Governor of East Timor Mário Viegas Carrascalão. After the end of the occupation, most Hindus left the country. In 2015, only 272 East Timorese profess Hinduism. Now the temple is quite run down, although some Balinese from Indonesia and East Timorese government has started efforts to revitalize the temple.

Gallery

See also
Balinese Hinduism
Hinduism in East Timor

References 

Religious buildings and structures in East Timor
Hindu temples in Asia
East Timor–India relations
Religious buildings and structures completed in 1987
Balinese temples